James Daniel Lowder (born January 2, 1963 in Quincy, Massachusetts) is an American author and editor, working regularly within the fantasy, dark fantasy, and horror genres, and on tabletop role-playing games and critical works exploring popular culture.

Early life and education
Lowder graduated from Whitman-Hanson Regional High School in 1981 and was inducted into the high school's hall of fame in 1991.  While at Whitman-Hanson, he wrote and edited for the school newspaper and yearbook, and did the same for two summers at Project Contemporary Competitiveness at Bridgewater State University. In 1985 he graduated from Marquette University with an honors BA in English and History. While at Marquette, he edited and wrote for the Marquette Journal, the school's literary magazine. After Marquette, he took graduate classes in English at the University of Illinois at Urbana–Champaign, where he also taught writing, film, and fantasy literature courses. Lowder completed a Masters in Literary Studies from the University of Wisconsin–Milwaukee in 1999.

Career

Novels and short fiction
His earliest novels were part of the Forgotten Realms and Ravenloft shared universe book lines, but beginning in the late 1990s he turned his attention more often to creator-owned projects.  His novels include Prince of Lies, The Ring of Winter, and Spectre of the Black Rose (the latter with Voronica Whitney-Robinson), and his short fiction has appeared in such anthologies such as Shadows Over Baker Street, Truth Until Paradox, and Historical Hauntings. Some of his short stories have been cited in the honorable mention list of the annual Year's Best Fantasy and Horror. He was an Origins Award finalist in the Best Short Fiction category for his 2003 novella, "The Night Chicago Died", a story that featured the debut of his mystery man character, The Corpse. His novels have been translated into more than a dozen languages.

Prose editing
As an editor, Lowder directed several best-selling book lines for TSR, Inc. in the late 1980s and early 1990s, including the Forgotten Realms, Ravenloft, and Dark Sun. In 1999, Peter Corless brought Lowder in to oversee the Pendragon fiction line for Green Knight Publishing; Lowder continued to reprint older Athurian works and also produced the original short story collections The Doom of Camelot (2000) and Legends of the Pendragon (2002) and the original novel Exiled from Camelot (2001). He served as executive editor for Green Knight Publishing's line of Arthurian fiction — the Pendragon fiction series — and as a consulting editor for CDS Books on their City of Heroes novels. Lowder has edited more than a dozen anthologies, with subjects ranging from King Arthur to superheroes to zombies. He has won several Origins Awards and an ENnie Award, and been shortlisted for an International Horror Guild Award for these projects. Though some of these anthologies have been published in connection with role-playing game product lines, they often contain only creator-copyrighted stories. This makes them unusual, as game publishers frequently insist on work for hire contracts for such projects.

Lowder edited a set of zombie anthologies based on the All Flesh Must Be Eaten game, beginning with The Book of All Flesh (2001); these were the first fiction books from Eden Studios. His final short story collection for the series was The Book of Final Flesh (2003). Lowder edited a 2003 anthology of short stories based on the Silver Age Sentinels game from Guardians of Order. He also worked on Astounding Hero Tales (2007) for Hero Games and Worlds of their Own (2008) for Paizo Publishing. Lowder produced Hobby Games: The 100 Best (2007) and Family Games: The 100 Best (2010) for Green Ronin Publishing.

In May, 2017, Chaosium appointed Lowder executive editor of their fiction line. Chaosium President Rick Meints commented on the hire: “James embodies that magic combination of wisdom and enthusiasm. Knowing his craft inside and out, he brings his advocacy and integrity to the table at every turn. Having him relaunch our fiction line is a ‘the stars are right’ moment.” Lowder had previously served as a consultant for Chaosium, helping the company and freelancers resolve payment and contract problems with past fiction projects.

Game design and editing
Lowder has designed, edited, or consulted on books for the first, second, third, and fifth editions of Dungeons & Dragons. He served as editor for the Carl Sargent B-series modules King's Festival and Queen's Harvest, edited and developed the Greyhawk module Puppets, and edited and wrote content for the early Forgotten Realms sourcebook Hall of Heroes. His other contributions to the Forgotten Realms RPG include design for Curse of the Azure Bonds and Inside Ravens Bluff, The Living City, project coordination on the three Avatar Trilogy modules, and design on The Jungles of Chult, which tied to his Realms novel The Ring of Winter. Lowder later consulted on the fifth edition product Tomb of Annihilation on the use of Artus Cimber, Aramag the dragon turtle, Ras Nsi, the city of Mezro, and other specific elements he had created for his earlier Realms fiction.

Lowder's other contributions to D&D include articles in Polyhedron and Dragon, entries in the first two volumes of the second edition Monstrous Compendium, as well as the Monstrous Compendium Spelljammer Appendix; development work on Spelljammer: AD&D Adventures in Space, and the darklord Stezen D'Polarno for the Ravenloft sourcebook Darklords. Lowder and Bruce Nesmith designed a two-round tournament featuring D'Polarno for Gen Con 1991, with Lowder creating a three-round Ravenloft tournament featuring D'Polarno, "The Return of Stezen D'Polarno (Or Portrait of the Artist as a Young Necromancer)" as the RPGA Grandmasters Event for Gen Con the following year. Lowder's other contributions to the Ravenloft RPG center around the domain of Sithicus, with sections in both the White Wolf/Arthaus releases Heroes of Light and Gazetteer Volume IV.

He has also designed or edited material for Pendragon, Prince Valiant: The Story-Telling Game, Marvel Super Heroes, GURPS, Deadlands, Mage: The Ascension, and Feng Shui. For the horror RPG Call of Cthulhu, Lowder contributed the Vanguard Club to the d20 Gamemaster's Pack and did early development and writing on the award-winning Pulp Cthulhu. Beginning in 2017, Lowder designed a linked trilogy of Call of Cthulhu scenarios tied to his Corpse prose fiction and comics cycle, running them as gamemaster at such conventions as Gen Con and Gamehole Con, sometimes for charities such as Worldbuilders. 

Since joining Chaosium as executive editor, Lowder has worked extensively on licensing for all of the company's role-playing game lines, helping to oversee both the licensing of Chaosium books to partner companies and securing licenses from other IP holders for Chaosium's use.

Comic books and other works
Lowder also works in comic books. He has penned scripts for several companies, including Image, DC, Devil's Due, and Desperado. A Ravenloft comic by Lowder was in the works before DC decided to end its relationship with TSR. His short work "Lost Loves", from the Moonstone Monsters: Demons anthology, was a finalist for the Bram Stoker Award in 2004 for Best Illustrated Narrative. He contributed as a writer and consulting editor to the Worlds of Dungeons & Dragons comic book series, published by Devil's Due. He became the editor for the monthly series Hack/Slash with issue #25 and continued with the series when it moved from Devil's Due to Image. His pulp hero serial "The Corpse: Orphans of the Air" ran as an occasional back-up in Hack/Slash, starting in 2011.

Lowder's critical essays and film, book, and comics reviews have appeared in such publications as Amazing Stories and Polyhedron, the latter of which featured his long-running video review column "Into the Dark" from 1991 to 1994. His essay "Scream for Your Life" appeared in the 2005 anthology  King Kong is Back!, edited by David Brin, while "Infinite Mutation, Eternal Stasis" appeared in The Unauthorized X-Men, edited by Len Wein, both from BenBella Books. He penned the entry on shared worlds for The Greenwood Encyclopedia of Science Fiction and Fantasy: Themes, Works, and Wonders.

In the media

Beginning in 2010, Lowder contributed to an annual "Games to Gift" holiday segment for the show "Lake Effect" on WUWM, Milwaukee Public Radio. He appeared as himself in episode 302 ("Man Beasts") on the television series Weird or What?, discussing the history of werewolf lore and the Beast of Bray Road. Lowder also served as a puppeteer for the low budget zombie puppet musical Misfit Heights (2012).

Notable works

Novels
Crusade (TSR, 1991)
Knight of the Black Rose (TSR, 1991)
The Ring of Winter (TSR, 1992)
Prince of Lies (TSR, 1993)
Name Your Nightmare (Random House Sprinter, 1995); written as J.D. Lowder.
Spectre of the Black Rose (Wizards of the Coast, 1999); with Voronica Whitney-Robinson.

Short fiction
"The Family Business" (in Realms of Valor, TSR, 1993)
"The Rigor of the Game" (in Tales of Ravenloft, TSR, 1994)
"Laughter in the Flames" (in Realms of Infamy, TSR, 1994)
"Make 'Em Laugh" (in Truth Until Paradox, White Wolf Publishing, 1995)
"Persistence of Vision" (in City of Darkness: Unseen, White Wolf Publishing, 1995)
"Truth in Advertising" (in The Splendour Falls, White Wolf Publishing, 1995)
"The Price of Freedom" (in Troll Magazine #1, December 1997)
"The Club Rules" (in Realms of Mystery, TSR, 1998)
"The Hollow Man" (in Shadis #52, October 1998)
"Heresies and Superstitions" (in The Leading Edge #39, March 2000)
"Pretender of the Faith" (in Historical Hauntings, DAW, 2001)
"The Unquiet Dreams of Cingris the Stout" (in Gaming Frontiers #2, March 2002)
"The Night Chicago Died" (in Pulp Zombies, Eden Studios, 2003)
"The Weeping Masks" (in Shadows Over Baker Street, Del Rey, 2003)
"She Dwelleth in the Cold of the Moon" (in The Repentant, DAW, 2003)
"Fanboy" (in Path of the Bold, Guardians of Order, 2004)
"Bandits in the Paths of Fame" (in Dragon #336, October 2005)
"Beneath the Skin" (in Heroes in Training, DAW, 2007)
"The Paper Shield" (in Sojourn: An Anthology of Speculative Fiction, FtB, 2014)
"King of the Frozen Men" (in Sojourn 2: An Anthology of Speculative Fiction, FtB, 2014)
"Morning in America" (in Delta Green: Extraordinary Renditions, Arc Dream Publishing, 2015)
"The Shadow and the Eye" (in Ghost in the Cogs, Broken Eye, 2015)
"Orphans of the Air" (in Peel Back the Skin, Grey Matter Press, 2016)
"The Crooked Smile Killers" (in Genius Loci: Tales of the Spirit of Place, Ragnarok, 2016)
"The Treachery of Bright Yesterdays" (in Tales of the Lost Citadel, Lost Citadel, 2016)

Comic Book Scripts
"Duel of Hearts" (in TSR Worlds Annual #1, DC Comics, September 1990)
"Art for Art's Sake" (in First Night Program, city of Boston, December 1996)
"Traitor's Gate" (in Mythography #2 & #3, Bardic Press, February and April 1997)
"Passion Play" (in Vampire: The Masquerade: Blood and Shadows, Moonstone, November 2003)
"Lost Loves" (in Moonstone Monsters: Demons, Moonstone, August 2004)
"The Man Who Collected Gods" (in Negative Burn #16, Desperado, December 2007)
"The Rigor of the Game" (in Worlds of Dungeons & Dragons #3, Devil's Due, July 2008)
"The Corpse: Orphans of the Air" (ongoing serial, begins in Hack/Slash #6, Image, July 2011)
"Night Funeral in Eminence" (in Hack/Slash, volume 9: Torture Prone, Image, September 2011)
"The Case of the Killer and the Questing King" (in Hack/Slash #18, Image, October 2012)

Anthologies (as editor)
Realms of Valor (TSR, 1993)
Realms of Infamy (TSR, 1994)
The Doom of Camelot (Green Knight Publishing, 2000)
The Book of All Flesh (Eden Studios, 2001)
Legends of the Pendragon (Green Knight Publishing, 2002)
The Book of More Flesh (Eden Studios, 2002)
The Book of Final Flesh (Eden Studios, 2003)
Path of the Just (Guardians of Order, 2003)
Path of the Bold (Guardians of Order, 2004)
Astounding Hero Tales (Hero Games, 2007)
Hobby Games: The 100 Best (Green Ronin Publishing, 2007)
Worlds of Their Own (Paizo Publishing, 2008)
The Best of All Flesh (Elder Signs Press, 2009)
Family Games: The 100 Best (Green Ronin Publishing, 2010)
Curse of the Full Moon: A Werewolf Anthology (Ulysses Press, 2010)
Triumph of The Walking Dead: Robert Kirkman's Zombie Epic on Page and Screen (BenBella Books, 2011)
Beyond the Wall: Exploring George R. R. Martin's A Song of Ice and Fire, From A Game of Thrones to A Dance with Dragons (BenBella Books, 2012)
Madness on the Orient Express (Chaosium, 2014)
The Munchkin Book (BenBella Books, 2016)
Chronicles of the Demon Lord (Schwalb Entertainment, 2016), with Robert J. Schwalb
Tales of Good Dogs (Onyx Path Publishing, 2019)

Awards and honors
2001 The Doom of Camelot, Origins Award nominee, Best Long-Form Fiction
2003 The Book of More Flesh, International Horror Guild Award nominee, Best Anthology; Origins Award nominee, Best Long-Form Fiction
2004 The Book of Final Flesh, Origins Award winner, Best Long Fiction
2004 "The Night Chicago Died", Origins Award nominee, Best Short Fiction
2005 Path of the Bold, Origins Award winner, Best Fiction
2005 "Lost Loves", Bram Stoker Award nominee, Illustrated Narrative
2008 Astounding Hero Tales, Origins Award winner, Fiction Publication of the Year; ENnie Award honorable mention, Best Regalia
2008 Hobby Games: The 100 Best, Origins Award winner, Non-Fiction Publication of the Year; ENnie Award winner, silver, Best Regalia
2009 Worlds of Dungeons & Dragons, Vol. 2, Origins Award winner, Best Fiction; ENnie Award nominee, Best Regalia
2010 The Best of All Flesh, Origins Award nominee, Best Book; ENnie Award honorable mention, Best Regalia
2011 Family Games: The 100 Best, Origins Award nominee, Best Game-Related Publication
2017 Industry Insider/Featured Presenter, Gen Con 50
2017 Pulp Cthulhu, Gold ENnie Award winner, Best Supplement; Dragon Award nominee, Best Science Fiction or Fantasy Miniatures/Collectible Card/Role Playing Game

References

External links
Worlds of Their Own Interview at Flames Rising (June 2008)
Interview at Flames Rising, a Horror & Dark Fantasy website (Oct 2006)
Interview at Candlekeep, a Forgotten Realms fansite
Interview at Fraternity of Shadows, a Ravenloft fansite

1963 births
20th-century American male writers
20th-century American novelists
21st-century American male writers
21st-century American novelists
American fantasy writers
American horror writers
American male novelists
Chaosium game designers
Dungeons & Dragons game designers
GURPS writers
Living people
Marquette University alumni
People from Quincy, Massachusetts
Print editors
Science fiction editors
University of Wisconsin–Milwaukee alumni
White Wolf game designers
Whitman-Hanson Regional High School alumni
Role-playing game writers